Hopewell Presbyterian Church is a historic Presbyterian church complex and national historic district located near Huntersville, Mecklenburg County, North Carolina. The church was built in 1833–1835, renovated and enlarged in 1859–1860, and expanded by a Sunday School addition in 1928.  It is a "U"-shaped brick and brick veneer building composed of three connected blocks all covered with front-gable roofs. The church is a rectangular gable-front brick building standing on a low mortared fieldstone foundation and Greek Revival style design elements. Also on the property are the contributing pumphouse (c. 1925), cemetery gate (1845), and cemetery with burials dating to 1775. The cemetery contains one of the two largest collections of box and chest tombs in North Carolina. General William Lee Davidson of the North Carolina militia, killed in 1781 at the Battle of Cowan's Ford during the American Revolutionary War, is buried in the cemetery.

It was added to the National Register of Historic Places in 1996.

References

Presbyterian churches in North Carolina
Cemeteries in North Carolina
Protestant Reformed cemeteries
Churches on the National Register of Historic Places in North Carolina
Colonial Revival architecture in North Carolina
Churches completed in 1835
Churches in Mecklenburg County, North Carolina
National Register of Historic Places in Mecklenburg County, North Carolina
Historic districts on the National Register of Historic Places in North Carolina